Motion 312 was a motion introduced to the Parliament of Canada by Stephen Woodworth, MP for Kitchener Centre, in 2012.

M-312 called for the formation of a committee "to review the declaration in Subsection 223(1) of the Criminal Code which states that a child becomes a human being only at the moment of complete birth".

Reception

Support 
Groups opposing legal abortion, such as the Campaign Life Coalition, supported Motion 312.

Opposition 
Groups supporting legal abortion, such as the Abortion Rights Coalition of Canada, opposed Motion 312.

Numerous labour unions in Canada opposed Motion 312.  This includes the Canadian Union of Public Employees (CUPE) and the Telecommunications Workers Union (TWU).

Results 
Motion 312 was defeated with a vote of 203–91 against.

References

41st Canadian Parliament
Abortion debate
Motions (parliamentary procedure)